The 2022 Atlanta Braves season was the 152nd season of the Atlanta Braves franchise, the 57th in Atlanta, and the Braves' sixth season at Truist Park. The Braves were managed by Brian Snitker, in his seventh season as the team’s manager. 

The Braves entered the season as the defending World Series champions after defeating the Houston Astros in the 2021 Fall Classic and were attempting to become the first to repeat as champions since the 2000 New York Yankees.

On December 2, 2021, Commissioner of Baseball Rob Manfred announced a lockout of players, following the expiration of the collective bargaining agreement (CBA) between Major League Baseball (MLB) and the Major League Baseball Players Association (MLBPA). On March 10, 2022, the MLB and MLBPA agreed to a new collective bargaining agreement, ending the lockout. Opening Day was played on April 7. Although MLB originally announced that several series would be cancelled due to the lockout, the agreement ultimately provided for a full 162-game season, with originally cancelled games being made up via doubleheaders.

After a slow start in the first two months of the season, the Braves exploded in June, starting the month off with a 14-game winning streak. In their final series at home during the regular season, the Braves swept their division rivals, the New York Mets, taking a 2-game lead and the head-to-head tiebreaker over the team that once led them by 10.5 games for first place in the division. In their second-to-last game of the regular season, the Braves clinched the NL East for the fifth year in a row. This season marked the first time since 2003 that the Braves finished with more than 100 wins, however they lost to the Philadelphia Phillies in the Division Series in four games.

Offseason

Lockout 

The expiration of the league's collective bargaining agreement (CBA) with the Major League Baseball Players Association occurred on December 1, 2021 with no new agreement in place. As a result, the team owners voted unanimously to lockout the players stopping all free agency and trades. 

The parties came to an agreement on a new CBA on March 10, 2022.

Rule changes 
Pursuant to the new CBA, several new rules were instituted for the 2022 season. The National League will adopt the designated hitter full-time, a draft lottery will be implemented, the postseason will expand from ten teams to twelve, and advertising patches will appear on player uniforms and helmets for the first time.

Transactions

November
November 15 – Manny Piña signed to a two-year, $16 million contract.

November 29 – Kirby Yates signed to a two-year, $8.25 million contract.

March
March 14 – Matt Olson acquired from the Oakland Athletics in exchange for Cristian Pache, Shea Langeliers, Ryan Cusick, and Joey Estes.
March 15 – Collin McHugh signed to a two-year, $10 million contract.
March 16 - Eddie Rosario signed to a two year contract. Alex Dickerson signed to a one-year, non-guaranteed contract.

Roster

Standings

National League East

National League Wild Card

Record vs. opponents

Regular season Game log
On March 10, 2022, the MLB and MLBPA agreed to a new collective bargaining agreement, thus ending the lockout. Opening Day is scheduled for April 7. Although MLB previously announced that several series would be cancelled due to the lockout, the agreement provides for a 162-game season, with originally canceled games to be made up via doubleheaders. Spring training is to begin on March 17.

|- style="background:#fbb;" 
| 1 || April 7 || Reds || 3–6 || Mahle (1–0) || Fried (0–1) || Santillan (1) || 40,545 || 0–1 || L1
|- style="background:#bfb;" 
| 2 || April 8 || Reds || 7–6 || Morton (1–0) || Sanmartin (0–1) || — || 40,234 || 1–1 || W1
|- style="background:#bfb;" 
| 3 || April 9 || Reds || 2–1 || Wright (1–0) || Gutiérrez (0–1) || Smith (1) || 40,310 || 2–1 || W2
|- style="background:#fbb;" 
| 4 || April 10 || Reds || 3–6 || Greene (1–0) || Anderson (0–1) || Warren (1) || 38,233 || 2–2 || L1
|- style="background:#fbb;"
| 5 || April 11 || Nationals || 2–11 || Rogers (1–0) || Ynoa (0–1) || — || 42,263 || 2–3 || L2
|- style="background:#bfb;" 
| 6 || April 12 || Nationals || 16–4 || Elder (1–0) || Corbin (0–2) || Stephens (1) || 31,462 || 3–3 || W1
|- style="background:#fbb;"
| 7 || April 13 || Nationals || 1–3 || Gray (1–1) || Fried (0–2) || Rainey (2) || 31,959 || 3–4 || L1
|- style="background:#fbb;" 
| 8 || April 14 || @ Padres || 1–12 || Musgrove (1–0) || Morton (1–1) || — || 44,844 || 3–5 || L2
|- style="background:#bfb;" 
| 9 || April 15 || @ Padres || 5–2 || O'Day (1–0) || Johnson (0–1) || Jansen (1) || 41,993 || 4–5 || W1
|- style="background:#bfb;" 
| 10 || April 16 || @ Padres || 5–2 || Anderson (1–1) || Martinez (0–1) || Jansen (2) || 36,924 || 5–5 || W2
|- style="background:#fbb;" 
| 11 || April 17 || @ Padres || 1–2 || Darvish (1–1) || Elder (1–1) || Rogers (4) || 37,694 || 5–6 || L1
|- style="background:#fbb;" 
| 12 || April 18 || @ Dodgers || 4–7 || Kershaw (2–0) || Ynoa (0–2) || Kimbrel (3) || 52,052 || 5–7 || L2
|- style="background:#bfb;" 
| 13 || April 19 || @ Dodgers || 3–1 || Fried (1–2) || Buehler (1–1) || Jansen (3) || 51,889 || 6–7 || W1
|- style="background:#fbb;" 
| 14 || April 20 || @ Dodgers || 1–5 || Gonsolin (1–0) || Morton (1–2) || — || 38,888 || 6–8 || L1
|- style="background:#bfb;" 
| 15 || April 22 || Marlins || 3–0 || Wright (2–0) || Rogers (0–3) || Jansen (4) || 40,402 || 7–8 || W1
|- style="background:#fbb;" 
| 16 || April 23 || Marlins || 7–9 || Okert (2–0) || Strider (0–1) || Scott (1) || 41,931 || 7–9 || L1
|- style="background:#fbb;" 
| 17 || April 24 || Marlins || 4–5 || Luzardo (1–1) || Elder (1–2) || Head (1) || 38,440 || 7–10 || L2
|- style="background:#bfb;" 
| 18 || April 26 || Cubs || 3–1 || Fried (2–2) || Stroman (0–3) || Jansen (5) || 31,990 || 8–10 || W1
|- style="background:#fbb;" 
| 19 || April 27 || Cubs || 3–6  || Robertson (1–0) || Matzek (0–1) || Wick (1) || 30,392 || 8–11 || L1
|- style="background:#bfb;" 
| 20 || April 28 || Cubs || 5–1 || Wright (3–0) || Smyly (1–2) || — || 34,183 || 9–11 || W1
|- style="background:#bfb;" 
| 21 || April 29 || @ Rangers || 6–3 || Anderson (2–1) || Richards (0–1) || Jansen (6) || 25,829 || 10–11 || W2
|- style="background:#fbb;" 
| 22 || April 30 || @ Rangers || 1–3 || Dunning (1–1) || Elder (1–3) || Barlow (1) || 36,097 || 10–12 || L1
|-

|- style="background:#fbb;" 
| 23 || May 1 || @ Rangers || 3–7 || Hearn (1–2) || Muller (0–1) || — || 38,316 || 10–13 || W1
|- style="background:#bfb;" 
| 24 || May 2 || @ Mets || 5–2 || Fried (3–2) || Bassitt (3–2) || Jansen (7) || 23,413 || 11–13 || W2
|- style="background:#fbb;" 
| 25 || May 3 || @ Mets || 4–5 || Peterson (1–0) || Morton (1–3) || Díaz (5) ||  || 11–14 || L1
|- style="background:#fbb;"
| 26 || May 3 || @ Mets || 0–3 || Carrasco (2–1) || Wright (3–1) || Lugo (2) || 27,206 || 11–15 || L2
|- style="background:#bfb;" 
| 27 || May 4 || @ Mets || 9–2 || Anderson (3–1) || Megill (4–1) || — || 23,973 || 12–15 || W1
|- style="background:#fbb;" 
| 28 || May 6 || Brewers || 3–6 || Lauer (3–0) || McHugh (0–1) || Hader (11) || 36,307 || 12–16 || L1
|- style="background:#bfb;" 
| 29 || May 7 || Brewers || 3–2 || Fried (4–2) || Burnes (1–2) || Jansen (8) || 37,857 || 13–16 || W1
|- style="background:#bfb;" 
| 30 || May 8 || Brewers || 9–2 || Morton (2–3) || Ashby (0–3) || — || 36,551 || 14–16 || W2
|- style="background:#fbb;" 
| 31 || May 10 || Red Sox || 4–9 || Danish (1–0) || Wright (3–2) || Schreiber (1) || 38,378 || 14–17 || L1
|- style="background:#bfb;" 
| 32 || May 11 || Red Sox || 5–3 || Jansen (1–0) || Brasier (0–1) || — || 37,200 || 15–17 || W1
|- style="background:#fbb;" 
| 33 || May 13 || Padres || 6–11 || García (1–2) || Smith (0–1) || Rogers (13) || 40,635 || 15–18 || L1
|- style="background:#bfb;" 
| 34 || May 14 || Padres || 6–5 || Jansen (2–0) || Wilson (3–1) || — || 40,490 || 16–18 || W1
|- style="background:#fbb;" 
| 35 || May 15 || Padres || 3–7  || Crismatt (2–0) || Stephens (0–1) || — || 40,114 || 16–19 || L1
|- style="background:#fbb;" 
| 36 || May 16 || @ Brewers || 0–1 || Peralta (3–1) || Anderson (3–2) || Hader (14) || 25,880 || 16–20 || L26
|- style="background:#bfb;" 
| 37 || May 17 || @ Brewers || 3–0 || Davidson (1–0) || Houser (3–4) || Jansen (9) || 28,910 || 17–20 || W1
|- style="background:#fbb;" 
| 38 || May 18 || @ Brewers || 6–7  || Kelley (1–0) || Chavez (0–1) || — || 27,014 || 17–21 || L1
|- style="background:#bfb;" 
| 39 || May 20 || @ Marlins || 5–3 || Morton (3–3) || Rogers (2–5) || Smith (2) || 9,776 || 18–21 || W1
|- style="background:#bfb;" 
| 40 || May 21 || @ Marlins || 4–3 || Wright (4–2) || Hernández (2–4) || Jansen (10) || 13,264 || 19–21 || W2
|- style="background:#fbb;" 
| 41 || May 22 || @ Marlins || 3–4 || Alcántara (4–2) || Anderson (3–3) || — || 17,908 || 19–22 || L1
|- style="background:#fbb;"
| 42 || May 23 || Phillies || 3–7 || Wheeler (3–3) || Davidson (1–1) || — || 41,762 || 19–23 || L2
|- style="background:#bfb;" 
| 43 || May 24 || Phillies || 6–5 || Jansen (3–0) || Nelson (1–1) || — || 32,274 || 20–23 || W1
|- style="background:#bfb;" 
| 44 || May 25 || Phillies || 8–4 || Strider (1–1) || Alvarado (0–2) || — || 29,339 || 21–23 || W2
|- style="background:#fbb;" 
| 45 || May 26 || Phillies || 1–4 || Nola (2–4) || Wright (4–3) || — || 33,188 || 21–24 || L1
|- style="background:#bfb;" 
| 46 || May 27 || Marlins || 6–4 || Stephens (1–1) || Bass (1–2) || Jansen (11) || 40,064 || 22–24 || W1
|- style="background:#fbb;" 
| 47 || May 28 || Marlins || 1–4 || Alcántara (5–2) || Davidson (1–2) || Sulser (2) || 40,682 || 22–25 || L1
|- style="background:#bfb;" 
| 48 || May 29 || Marlins || 6–3 || Fried (5–2) || Hernández (2–5) || Jansen (12) || 39,669 || 23–25 || W1
|- style="background:#fbb;" 
| 49 || May 30 || @ Diamondbacks || 2–6 || Gallen (4–0) || Strider (1–2) || — || 20,735 || 23–26 || L1
|- style="background:#fbb;" 
| 50 || May 31 || @ Diamondbacks || 7–8  || Melancon (1–5) || Stephens (1–2) || — || 12,686 || 23–27 || L2
|-

|- style="background:#bfb;" 
| 51 || June 1 || @ Diamondbacks || 6–0 || Wright (5–3) || Bumgarner (2–4) || — || 12,370 || 24–27 || W1
|- style="background:#bfb;" 
| 52 || June 2 || @ Rockies || 13–6 || Anderson (4–3) || Gomber (2–6) || — || 26,594 || 25–27 || W2
|- style="background:#bfb;" 
| 53 || June 3 || @ Rockies || 3–1  || Minter (1–0) || Estévez (1–2) || Jansen (13) || 37,336 || 26–27 || W3
|- style="background:#bfb;" 
| 54 || June 4 || @ Rockies || 6–2  || Minter (2–0) || Chacín (3–2) || — || 41,054 || 27–27 || W4
|- style="background:#bfb;" 
| 55 || June 5 || @ Rockies || 8–7 || Morton (4–3) || Feltner (1–2) || Jansen (14) || 39,409 || 28–27 || W5
|- style="background:#bfb;" 
| 56 || June 7 || Athletics || 3–2 || Wright (6–3) || Trivino (1–4) || Jansen (15) || 33,981 || 29–27 || W6
|- style="background:#bfb;" 
| 57 || June 8 || Athletics || 13–2 || Anderson (5–3) || Koenig (0–1) || — || 42,075 || 30–27 || W7
|- style="background:#bfb;"
| 58 || June 9 || Pirates || 3–1 || Fried (6–2) || Brubaker (0–6) || Jansen (16) || 39,336 || 31–27 || W8
|- style="background:#bfb;" 
| 59 || June 10 || Pirates || 4–2 || Strider (2–2) || Contreras (1–1) || Jansen (17) || 41,404 || 32–27 || W9
|- style="background:#bfb;"
| 60 || June 11 || Pirates || 10–4 || Chavez (1–1) || Underwood Jr. (0–2) || — || 41,219 || 33–27 || W10
|- style="background:#bfb;"
| 61 || June 12 || Pirates || 5–3 || Wright (7–3) || Quintana (1–4) || Jansen (18) || 35,446 || 34–27 || W11
|- style="background:#bfb;"
| 62 || June 13 || @ Nationals || 9–5 || Lee (1–0) || Ramírez (1–1) || — || 20,571 || 35–27 || W12
|- style="background:#bfb;"
| 63 || June 14 || @ Nationals || 10–4 || Fried (7–2) || Tetreault (0–1) || Stephens (2) || 24,490 || 36–27 || W13
|- style="background:#bfb;" 
| 64 || June 15 || @ Nationals || 8–2 || Strider (3–2) || Fedde (4–5) || — || 21,153 || 37–27 || W14
|- style="background:#fbb;" 
| 65 || June 17 || @ Cubs || 0–1 || Martin (1–0) || Minter (2–1) || Robertson (8) || 35,676 || 37–28 || L1
|- style="background:#fbb;" 
| 66 || June 18 || @ Cubs || 3–6 || Steele (2–5) || Wright (7–4) || — || 40,755 || 37–29 || L2
|- style="background:#bfb;" 
| 67 || June 19 || @ Cubs || 6–0 || Anderson (6–3) || Hendricks (2–6) || — || 40,369 || 38–29 || W1
|- style="background:#bfb;" 
| 68 || June 20 || Giants || 2–1 || Jansen (4–0) || Doval (2–3) || — || 40,589 || 39–29 || W2
|- style="background:#fbb;" 
| 69 || June 21 || Giants || 10–12 || Rogers (1–3) || O'Day (1–1) || — || 35,384 || 39–30 || L1
|- style="background:#bfb;" 
| 70 || June 22 || Giants || 4–3 || Minter (3–1) || McGee (1–2) || — || 38,478 || 40–30 || W1
|- style="background:#bfb;" 
| 71 || June 23 || Giants || 7–6 || Wright (8–4) || Wood (5–6) || Jansen (19) || 36,870 || 41–30 || W2
|- style="background:#fbb;" 
| 72 || June 24 || Dodgers || 1–4 || Urías (5–6) || Anderson (6–4) || Kimbrel (13) || 42,105 || 41–31 || L1
|- style="background:#bfb;" 
| 73 || June 25 || Dodgers || 5–3 || Minter (4–1) || Graterol (2–3) || Jansen (20) || 42,161 || 42–31 || W1
|- style="background:#fbb;"
| 74 || June 26 || Dodgers || 3–5  || Kimbrel (1–3) || O'Day (1–2) || Graterol (1) || 42,217 || 42–32 || L1
|- style="background:#bfb;" 
| 75 || June 28 || @ Phillies || 5–3 || McHugh (1–1) || Bellatti (1–3) || Minter (1) || 27,725 || 43–32 || W1
|- style="background:#bfb;" 
| 76 || June 29 || @ Phillies || 4–1 || Wright (9–4) || Suárez (6–5) || Smith (3) || 25,621 || 44–32 || W2
|- style="background:#fbb;" 
| 77 || June 30 || @ Phillies || 4–14 || Nola (5–5) || Anderson (6–5) || — || 30,131 || 44–33 || L1
|-

|- style="background:#bfb;"
| 78 || July 1 || @ Reds || 9–1 || Fried (8–2) || Minor (1–5) || — || 28,606 || 45–33 || W1
|- style="background:#bfb;"
| 79 || July 2 || @ Reds || 4–1 || Strider (4–2) || Mahle (3–7) || Smith (4) || 26,755 || 46–33 || W2
|- style="background:#fbb;" 
| 80 || July 3 || @ Reds || 3–4 || Strickland (1–2) || Minter (4–2) || — || 21,418 || 46–34 || L1
|- style="background:#bfb;" 
| 81 || July 4 || Cardinals || 6–3 || O'Day (2–2) || Hudson (6–5) || Smith (5) || 41,975 || 47–34 || W1
|- style="background:#bfb;" 
| 82 || July 5 || Cardinals || 7–1 || Anderson (7–5) || Pallante (2–4) || — || 35,656 || 48–34 || W2
|- style="background:#bfb;" 
| 83 || July 6 || Cardinals || 3–0 || Fried (9–2) || Mikolas (5–7) || Minter (2) || 36,718 || 49–34 || W3
|- style="background:#fbb;" 
| 84 || July 7 || Cardinals || 2–3  || Helsley (5–1) || Matzek (0–2) || Naughton (1) || 37,756 || 49–35 || L1
|- style="background:#bfb;"
| 85 || July 8 || Nationals || 12–2 || Morton (5–3) || Fedde (5–6) || — || 41,725 || 50–35 || W1
|- style="background:#bfb;"
| 86 || July 9 || Nationals || 4–3 || Wright (10–4) || Corbin (4–11) || Minter (3) || 40,632 || 51–35 || W2
|- style="background:#bfb;"
| 87 || July 10 || Nationals || 4–3  || McHugh (2–1) || Weems (0–1) || — || 32,053 || 52–35 || W3
|- style="background:#fbb;"
| 88 || July 11 || Mets || 1–4 || Scherzer (6–1) || Fried (9–3) || Díaz (19) || 42,925 || 52–36 || L1
|- style="background:#bfb;" 
| 89 || July 12 || Mets || 4–1 || Matzek (1–2) || Peterson (5–2) || Minter (4) || 42,217 || 53–36 || W1
|- style="background:#fbb;"
| 90 || July 13 || Mets || 3–7 || Bassitt (7–6) || Morton (5–4) || — || 34,879 || 53–37 || L1
|- style="background:#bfb;" 
| 91 || July 14 || @ Nationals || 5–4 || Wright (11–4) || Sánchez (0–1) || Jansen (21) || 25,577 || 54–37 || W1
|- style="background:#bfb;"
| 92 || July 15 || @ Nationals || 8–4 || Anderson (8–5) || Corbin (4–12) || Minter (5) || 30,409 || 55–37 || W2
|- style="background:#bfb;"
| 93 || July 16 || @ Nationals || 6–3 || Fried (10–3) || Espino (0–3) || Jansen (22) || 37,880 || 56–37 || W3
|- style="background:#fbb;"
| 94 || July 17 || @ Nationals || 3–7 || Cishek (1–2) || Strider (4–3) || — || 26,043 || 56–38 || L1
|- style="background:#bbcaff;"
| – || July 19 || colspan="10" | 92nd All-Star Game: Los Angeles, CA
|- style="background:#bfb;"
| 95 || July 22 || Angels || 8–1 || Lee (2–0) || Ohtani (9–5) || — || 42,867 || 57–38 || W1
|- style="background:#bfb;"
| 96 || July 23 || Angels || 7–2 || Wright (12–4) || Sandoval (3–6) || — || 42,827 || 58–38 || W2
|- style="background:#fbb;"
| 97 || July 24 || Angels || 1–9 || Detmers (3–3) || Anderson (8–6) || — || 42,663 || 58–39 || L1
|- style="background:#fbb;"
| 98 || July 25 || @ Phillies || 4–6 || Bellatti (2–3) || Minter (4–3) || Domínguez (5) || 25,452 || 58–40 || L2
|- style="background:#bfb;"
| 99 || July 26 || @ Phillies || 6–3 || Strider (5–3) || Nola (6–8) || Jansen (23) || 27,486 || 59–40 || W1
|- style="background:#fbb;"
| 100 || July 27 || @ Phillies || 2–7 || Gibson (6–4) || Morton (5–5) || — || 29,038 || 59–41 || L1
|- style="background:#bfb;" 
| 101 || July 29 || Diamondbacks || 5–2 || Wright (13–4) || Bumgarner (6–10) || Jansen (24) || 41,536 || 60–41 || W1
|- style="background:#bfb;" 
| 102 || July 30 || Diamondbacks || 6–2 || Anderson (9–6) || Martin (0–1) || — || 41,682 || 61–41 || W2
|- style="background:#bfb;" 
| 103 || July 31 || Diamondbacks || 1–0 || Jansen (5–0) || Melancon (3–9) || — || 39,005 || 62–41 || W3
|-

|- style="background:#bfb;"
| 104 || August 2 || Phillies || 13–1 || Strider (6–3) || Nelson (3–2) || — || 38,932 || 63–41 || W4
|- style="background:#fbb;"
| 105 || August 3 || Phillies || 1–3 || Wheeler (10–5) || McHugh (2–2) || Robertson (15) || 30,380 || 63–42 || L1
|- style="background:#fbb;"
| 106 || August 4 || @ Mets || 4–6 || Carrasco (12–5) || Wright (13–5) || Díaz (24) || 38,693 || 63–43 || L2
|- style="background:#bfb;" 
| 107 || August 5 || @ Mets || 9–6 || Minter (5–3) || Walker (9–3) || — || 40,305 || 64–43 || W1
|- style="background:#fbb;" 
| 108 || August 6 || @ Mets || 5–8 || Peterson (6–2) || Odorizzi (4–4) || Díaz (25) || 37,790 || 64–44 || L1
|- style="background:#fbb;"
| 109 || August 6 || @ Mets || 2–6 || Scherzer (8–2) || Fried (10–4) || — || 37,452 || 64–45 || L2
|- style="background:#fbb;" 
| 110 || August 7 || @ Mets || 2–5 || deGrom (1–0) || Strider (6–4) || Díaz (26) || 37,717 || 64–46 || L3
|- style="background:#bfb;"
| 111 || August 9 || @ Red Sox || 9–7  || Lee (3–0) || Ort (0–1) || Matzek (1) || 34,972 || 65–46 || W1
|- style="background:#bfb;"
| 112 || August 10 || @ Red Sox || 8–4 || Wright (14–5) || Pivetta (8–9) || — || 35,406 || 66–46 || W2
|- style="background:#bfb;"
| 113 || August 12 || @ Marlins || 4–3 || Matzek (2–2) || Hernández (2–6) || Jansen (25) || 10,459 || 67–46 || W3
|- style="background:#bfb;"
| 114 || August 13 || @ Marlins || 5–2 || Muller (1–1) || Luzardo (3–5) || Jansen (26) || 7,308 || 68–46 || W4
|- style="background:#bfb;"
| 115 || August 13 || @ Marlins || 6–2 || Anderson (10–6) || Nance (0–1) || Iglesias (17) || 11,910 || 69–46 || W5
|- style="background:#bfb;"
| 116 || August 14 || @ Marlins || 3–1 || Matzek (3–2) || Scott (4–5) || Jansen (27) || 10,902 || 70–46 || W6
|- style="background:#bfb;"
| 117 || August 15 || Mets || 13–1 || Strider (7–4) || Carrasco (13–5) || — || 38,380 || 71–46 || W7
|- style="background:#bfb;"
| 118 || August 16 || Mets || 5–0 || Morton (6–5) || Alvarez (0–1) || — || 37,449 || 72–46 || W8
|- style="background:#fbb;"
| 119 || August 17 || Mets || 7–9 || Scherzer (9–2) || Odorizzi (4–5) || — || 34,308 || 72–47 || L1
|- style="background:#bfb;"
| 120 || August 18 || Mets || 3–2 || Fried (11–4) || deGrom (2–1) || Jansen (28) || 39,378 || 73–47 || W1
|- style="background:#bfb;"
| 121 || August 19 || Astros || 6–2 || Wright (15–5) || McCullers Jr. (1–1) || — || 42,837 || 74–47 || W2
|- style="background:#bfb;"
| 122 || August 20 || Astros || 5–4  || Stephens (2–2) || Stanek (1–1) || — || 42,893 || 75–47 || W3
|- style="background:#fbb;"
| 123 || August 21 || Astros || 4–5 || Urquidy (12–4) || Lee (3–1) || Pressly (25) || 42,531 || 75–48 || L1
|- style="background:#bfb;"
| 124 || August 22 || @ Pirates || 2–1 || Odorizzi (5–5) || Contreras (3–4) || Jansen (29) || 11,231 || 76–48 || W1
|- style="background:#bfb;"
| 125 || August 23 || @ Pirates || 6–1 || Fried (12–4) || Brubaker (3–11) || — || 13,367 || 77–48 || W2
|- style="background:#bfb;"
| 126 || August 24 || @ Pirates || 14–2 || Wright (16–5) || Keller (4–10) || — || 12,060 || 78–48 || W3
|- style="background:#bfb;"
| 127 || August 26 || @ Cardinals || 11–4 || Strider (8–4) || Quintana (4–6) || — || 46,027 || 79–48 || W4
|- style="background:#fbb;"
| 128 || August 27 || @ Cardinals || 5–6 || Helsley (8–1) || Jansen (5–1) || — || 46,119 || 79–49 || L1
|- style="background:#fbb;" 
| 129 || August 28 || @ Cardinals || 3–6 || Helsley (9–1) || Minter (5–4) || Gallegos (13) || 42,897 || 79–50 || L2
|- style="background:#fbb;"
| 130 || August 30 || Rockies || 2–3 || Ureña (3–5) || Fried (12–5) || Bard (28) || 34,237 || 79–51 || L3
|- style="background:#bfb;" 
| 131 || August 31 || Rockies || 3–2 || Wright (17–5) || Feltner (2–6) || Jansen (30) || 29,554 || 80–51 || W1
|-

|- style="background:#bfb;"
| 132 || September 1 || Rockies || 3–0 || Strider (9–4) || Kuhl (6–8) || Jansen (31) || 31,203 || 81–51 || W2
|- style="background:#bfb;"
| 133 || September 2 || Marlins || 8–1 || Morton (7–5) || Alcántara (12–7) || — || 42,161 || 82–51 || W3
|- style="background:#bfb;"
| 134 || September 3 || Marlins || 2–1 || Matzek (4–2) || Okert (5–2) || — || 42,405 || 83–51 || W4
|- style="background:#bfb;"
| 135 || September 4 || Marlins || 7–1 || Fried (13–5) || López (8–9) || — || 42,360 || 84–51 || W5
|- style="background:#bfb;" 
| 136 || September 6 || @ Athletics || 10–9 || Chavez (3–1) || Payamps (3–4) || Jansen (32) || 6,062 || 85–51 || W6
|- style="background:#bfb;"
| 137 || September 7 || @ Athletics || 7–3 || Strider (10–4) || Waldichuk (0–1) || — || 5,332 || 86–51 || W7
|- style="background:#bfb;"
| 138 || September 9 || @ Mariners || 6–4 || Morton (8–5) || Ray (12–9) || Jansen (33) || 42,114 || 87–51 || W8
|- style="background:#fbb;" 
| 139 || September 10 || @ Mariners || 1–3 || Kirby (7–3) || Fried (13–6) || Sewald (19) || 44,965 || 87–52 || L1
|- style="background:#fbb;" 
| 140 || September 11 || @ Mariners || 7–8 || Sewald (4–4) || Jansen (5–2) || — || 45,245 || 87–53 || L2
|- style="background:#fbb;"
| 141 || September 12 || @ Giants || 2–3 || Cobb (6–6) || Strider (10–5) || Alexander (1) || 23,790 || 87–54 || L3
|- style="background:#bfb;" 
| 142 || September 13 || @ Giants || 5–1 || Wright (18–5) || Junis (4–6) || — || 24,872 || 88–54 || W1
|- style="background:#fbb;" 
| 143 || September 14 || @ Giants || 1–4 || Rodón (13–8) || Morton (8–6) || Doval (23) || 25,093 || 88–55 || L1
|- style="background:#bfb;" 
| 144 || September 16 || Phillies || 7–2 || Chavez (4–1) || Domínguez (6–5) || — || 42,578 || 89–55 || W1
|- style="background:#bfb;" 
| 145 || September 17 || Phillies || 4–3 || Lee (4–1) || Nola (9–12) || Jansen (34) || 42,542 || 90–55 || W2
|- style="background:#bfb;"
| 146 || September 18 || Phillies || 5–2 || Strider (11–5) || Brogdon (2–1) || — || 42,015 || 91–55 || W3
|- style="background:#bfb;" 
| 147 || September 19 || Nationals || 5–2 || Wright (19–5) || Abbott (0–3) || Jansen (35) || 33,443 || 92–55 || W4
|- style="background:#bfb;"
| 148 || September 20 || Nationals || 3–2 || Morton (9–6) || Ramírez (4–2) || Jansen (36) || 40,224 || 93–55 || W5
|- style="background:#fbb;" 
| 149 || September 21 || Nationals || 2–3 || Machado (2–0) || Chavez (4–2) || Finnegan (11) || 37,240 || 93–56 || L1
|- style="background:#fbb;" 
| 150 || September 22 || @ Phillies || 0–1 || Suárez (10–5) || Fried (13–7) || Alvarado (2) || 21,276 || 93–57 || L2
|- style="background:#fbb;" 
| 151 || September 23 || @ Phillies || 1–9 || Nola (10–12) || Odorizzi (5–6) || — || 28,013 || 93–58 || L3
|- style="background:#bfb;"
| 152 || September 24 || @ Phillies || 6–3 || Wright (20–5) || Falter (5–4) || Jansen (37) || 36,692 || 94–58 || W1
|- style="background:#bfb;" 
| 153 || September 25 || @ Phillies || 8–7  || Stephens (3–2) || Bellatti (4–4) || — || 32,090 || 95–58 || W2
|- style="background:#bfb;"
| 154 || September 26 || @ Nationals || 8–0 || Elder (2–3) || Abbott (0–4) || — || 24,684 || 96–58 || W3
|- style="background:#bfb;"
| 155 || September 27 || @ Nationals || 8–2 || McHugh (3–2) || Espino (0–8) || — || 23,281 || 97–58 || W4
|- style="background:#fbb;" 
| 156 || September 28 || @ Nationals || 2–3  || Finnegan (6–4) || Stephens (3–3) || — || 24,876 || 97–59 || L1
|- style="background:#bfb;"
| 157 || September 30 || Mets || 5–2 || Fried (14–7) || deGrom (5–4) || Jansen (38) || 42,402 || 98–59 || W1
|-

|- style="background:#bfb;"
| 158 || October 1 || Mets || 4–2 || Wright (21–5) || Scherzer (11–5) || Jansen (39) || 42,561 || 99–59 || W2
|- style="background:#bfb;" 
| 159 || October 2 || Mets || 5–3 || Lee (5–1) || Bassitt (15–9) || Jansen (40) || 42,713 || 100–59 || W3
|- style="background:#fbb;" 
| 160 || October 3 || @ Marlins || 0–4 || Luzardo (4–7) || Elder (2–4) || — || 10,767 || 100–60 || L1
|- style="background:#bfb;" 
| 161 || October 4 || @ Marlins || 2–1 || Odorizzi (6–6) || Garrett (3–7) || Jansen (41) || 14,138 || 101–60 || W1
|- style="background:#fbb;" 
| 162 || October 5 || @ Marlins || 9–12 || Nardi (1–1) || Chavez (4–3) || Floro (10) || 12,195 || 101–61 || L1
|-

|-
| Legend:       = Win       = Loss       = PostponementBold = Braves team memberPostseason
Game Log

|- style="background:#fbb;" 
| 1 || October 11 || Phillies || 6–7 || Domínguez (1–0) || Fried (0–1) || — || 42,641 || 0–1
|- style="background:#bfb;" 
| 1 || October 12 || Phillies || 3–0 || Wright (1–0) || Wheeler (0–1) || Jansen (1) || 42,735 || 1–1
|- style="background:#fbb;" 
| 3 || October 14 || @ Phillies || 1–9 || Nola (2–0) || Strider (0–1) || — || 45,538 || 1–2
|- style="background:#fbb;" 
| 4 || October 15 || @ Phillies || 3–8 || Hand (1–0) || Morton (0–1) || — || 45,660 || 1–3  

Postseason rosters

| style="text-align:left" | 
Pitchers: 12 Jake Odorizzi 26 Raisel Iglesias 30 Kyle Wright 32 Collin McHugh 33 A. J. Minter 50 Charlie Morton 52 Dylan Lee 53 Jackson Stephens 54 Max Fried 60 Jesse Chavez 65 Spencer Strider 74 Kenley Jansen
Catchers: 16 Travis d'Arnaud 24 William Contreras 
Infielders: 7 Dansby Swanson 11 Orlando Arcia 17 Ehire Adrianza 18 Vaughn Grissom 27 Austin Riley 28 Matt Olson 
Outfielders: 8 Eddie Rosario 13 Ronald Acuña Jr. 15 Robbie Grossman 20 Marcell Ozuna 23 Michael Harris II 38 Guillermo Heredia 
|- valign="top"

 Statistics 
 Batting (Final stats)Players in bold are on the active roster.Note: G = Games played; AB = At bats; R = Runs; H = Hits; 2B = Doubles; 3B = Triples; HR = Home runs; RBI = Runs batted in; SB = Stolen bases; BB = Walks; K = Strikeouts; Avg. = Batting average; OBP = On-base Percentage; SLG = Slugging percentage; TB = Total basesSource

 Pitching (Final stats)Players in bold are on the active roster.Note: W = Wins; L = Losses; ERA = Earned run average; WHIP = Walks plus hits per inning pitched; G = Games pitched; GS = Games started; SV = Saves; IP = Innings pitched; H = Hits allowed; R = Runs allowed; ER = Earned runs allowed; BB = Walks allowed; K = StrikeoutsSource

Farm system

References

External links
2022 Atlanta Braves season at Baseball Reference''

Atlanta Braves seasons
Atlanta Braves
Atlanta Braves
National League East champion seasons